Tabriz Shahrdary Team is an Iranian UCI Continental cycling team established in 2014.

Team history
The team was established with two title sponsors: Tabriz and Ranking Helmets, a Taiwanese cycling equipment company. In the team's first season it became the first Iranian member of Mouvement pour un cyclisme crédible (MPCC).

Team roster

Major wins
2014
Stage 2 Tour de Singkarak, Hossein Alizadeh
2015
Stage 2 Tour of Iran (Azerbaijan), Saeid Safarzadeh
2016
 National Road Race Championships, Mehdi Sohrabi
Overall Tour of Iran (Azerbaijan), Samad Pourseyedi
Stage 4, Samad Pourseyedi
Stage 5, Ghader Mizbani
2017
 National Time Trial Championships, Samad Pourseyedi
Stage 3 Tour of Iran (Azerbaijan), Saeid Safarzadeh
2018
Stage 3 Tour of Mesopotamia, Hamid Pourhashemi
 National Road Race Championships, Saeid Safarzadeh
Stage 5 Tour of Iran (Azerbaijan), Saeid Safarzadeh

References

UCI Continental Teams (Asia)
Cycling teams established in 2014
Cycling teams based in Iran
2014 establishments in Iran
Sport in Tabriz
Shahrdari Tabriz